Candlewood Orchards is a private residential community and census-designated place (CDP) in the town of Brookfield, Fairfield County, Connecticut, United States. It is in the northwest part of the town, on the east shore of Candlewood Lake. It is bordered to the north by Candlewood Shores and to the west and south by the town of New Fairfield.

Candlewood Orchards was first listed as a CDP prior to the 2020 census.

References 

Census-designated places in Fairfield County, Connecticut
Census-designated places in Connecticut